Sports in Morocco refers to the sports played in the Kingdom of Morocco. As of 2007, Moroccan society participated in many sports, including handball, football, golf, tennis, basketball, and athletics. Hicham El Guerrouj, a retired middle distance runner for Morocco, won two gold medals for Morocco at the Athletics at the 2004 Summer Olympics.

Association football has historically been particularly popular amongst persons of African descent and is Morocco's most popular sport. Other popular sports include: athletics, Futsal, basketball, boxing, golf, netball, swimming, surfing and tennis.

Morocco has hosted many international events such as the 1988 African Cup of Nations, 2013 FIFA Club World Cup, 2014 FIFA Club World Cup, 2018 African Nations Championship and the 2022 FIFA Club World Cup. Most of the events hosted are football related since it is the most popular sport in the country.

Ministry of Youth and Sports 
The Moroccan Ministry of Youth and Sports was founded in August 1964 and houses all the sporting federations in the country. Despite the Ministry's mission to engage young people in sporting opportunities, many Moroccan athletes denounce the institution as not giving young Moroccans enough sponsorship or opportunities to play sports professionally.

By Sport

Football 

The Royal Moroccan Football Federation based in Rabat is the governing body of football in Morocco. Morocco qualified for the FIFA World Cup six times and bid for the World Cups 1994, 1998, 2006, 2010 and 2026 but lost out to United States, France, Germany, South Africa and Canada/Mexico/United States in these bids. Morocco is now co-bidding for the 2030 with either Portugal/Spain or Algeria/Tunisia.

 Morocco national football team
 Morocco national under-23 football team
 Morocco national under-20 football team
 Morocco women's national football team
 Botola
 Botola 2
 National

Botola 

The "Botola" Pro is the top league competition for football clubs in Morocco. Each season 16 teams compete for the championship. Champion and runner-up participate in the African Champions League. The most successful clubs in the league are: AS FAR, and Wydad Casablanca, and Raja Casablanca.

The Moroccan top-flight has produced the second-highest number of CAF Champions League titles, with three Moroccan clubs having won seven African trophies in total. They also produced the highest number of CAF Confederation Cup titles, with five Moroccan clubs having won seven African confederation trophies.

Futsal 
Morocco's popularity for Futsal has risen over the years due to its similarity to football. Morocco national futsal team is a major force in the African and Arab world. They hosted the 2020 Africa Futsal Cup of Nations. Their first major trophy came in 2016, after defeating Egypt in the final. They have won the Africa Futsal Cup of Nations twice. They also won the Arab Futsal Cup twice.

Morocco qualified for the FIFA Futsal World Cup three times, Their best performance was in 2021, where they reached the round of 16. Morocco is the only African and Arab country to have won the Futsal Confederations Cup.

Kickboxing 
Morocco is known for having great Kickboxing fighters, Badr Hari is considered to be one of the best Kickboxer in the world.

Equestrian sports 
Morocco has a vibrant equestrian sports community headed by the Royal Moroccan Equestrian Federation. Morocco's most famous equestrian, Abdelkebir Ouaddar, represented the country in the 2014 Normandy World Equestrian Games and 2016 Summer Olympics in Rio de Janeiro, Brazil.

Motorsport 
 Moroccan Grand Prix (Formula One, sports car, and touring car racing)
 Marrakech Street Circuit (World Touring Car Championship)
Miss Moto Maroc (all female motorcycle club in Morocco)

Mehdi Bennani is Morocco's most notable racing driver. He has competed in the World Touring Car Championship since 2009, where he has scored a number of top three finishes. In 2014 he scored his first WTCC win at the championship's Shanghai round.

Cricket 
Morocco national cricket team

Morocco hosted the 2002 Morocco Cup, which was well attended. Sri Lanka beat South Africa in the final.

Morocco boasts an ICC approved ground capable of hosting full internationals, the National Cricket Stadium in Tangier. It has so far hosted a One Day International triangular tournament, the Morocco Cup in 2002, where Sri Lanka won ahead of South Africa and Pakistan.

Basketball 

Morocco, represented by the Moroccan Royal Basketball Federation, has been affiliated to FIBA since 1936. The men's national team has won a FIBA Africa Championship title, won in 1965. The professional national league is Nationale 1.

Women's volleyball 
Morocco has a successful women's national volleyball team which lastly qualified for the 2021 Women's African Nations Volleyball Championship where it won the bronze medal.

Rugby union 

Rugby union came to Morocco in the early 20th century, mainly by the French who occupied the country. As a result, Moroccan rugby was tied to the fortunes of France, during the first and second World War, with many Moroccan players going away to fight. Like many other Maghreb nations, Moroccan rugby tended to look to Europe for inspiration, rather than to the rest of Africa.

Notable Moroccan players include:

Abdelatif Benazzi
Said Boucha
Abdellatif Boutaty
Rachid Karmouchi
Djalil Narjissi

Ice Hockey 
Morocco was admitted into the International Ice Hockey Federation on May 22, 2010.

Hosting international sports 
Morocco had vied many times for hosting the FIFA World Cup, mostly notably losing to Canada/Mexico/United States in 2026 to be the first by three countries to host the tournament.

Morocco hosted the 2019 African Games in Rabat; it was the first time that the country hosted the event. It was the largest African Games ever and the largest sporting event to be hosted by Morocco.

In 2019, it was announced that Morocco would host the inaugural African Para Games in Rabat in January 2020. however, due to poor relations between the Africa Paralympic Committee and the country's authorities, Morocco withdrew and the event took place in Cairo, Egypt.

Stadiums

 Stade d'Agadir
 Stade Cheikh Laaghdef
 Stade Complexe Sportif
 Stade d'Honneur
 Stade Larbi Zaouli
 Stade Mohammed V
 Stade Moulay Abdellah
 Stade de Tanger
 Stade de Marrakech
 Complexe OCP
 Saniat Rmel
 Stade Al Inbiaâte
 Stade El Abdi
 Stade El Harti
 Stade El Massira
 Stade Marche Verte
 Stade Municipal (Kenitra)
 Stade Sidi Bernoussi
 Stade d'Honneur (Meknes)
 Stade de Marchan
 Stade du 20 Août
 Complexe Al Amal de Casablanca

See also

 Morocco at the Olympics
 Morocco men's national handball team
 Morocco - Golf Holidays

References